Sabrina Frederick (formerly Frederick-Traub; born 23 November 1996) is an English-born Australian rules footballer who plays for the Collingwood Football Club in the AFL Women's competition. She was one of Brisbane's two marquee players for the 2017 season, alongside Tayla Harris.

Early life
Frederick spent her early years in Brighton, England. Her mother is White British and her biological father is of Jamaican and Antiguan descent. Her step-father's surname "Traub" was added to her name as a child, but in 2020 she announced that she was reverting to the name "Frederick" for several reasons.

Frederick and her family moved to Australia when she was seven, although she has said considers herself English and "my family still kept me immersed in the British culture". She grew up in Pinjarra, Western Australia.

Junior and state-league football
Frederick played in mixed-gender teams until the age of thirteen, when she began playing for the Peel Thunderbirds (an all-female team). She eventually progressed to the club's senior team in the West Australian Women's Football League (WAWFL). In 2013, Frederick captained an Australian youth girls team on a tour of New Zealand. She kicked three goals in the latter game.

AFL Women's career

Brisbane (2017–2019)
She made her senior debut for Brisbane in round one of the 2017 season, against  at Casey Fields. She was responsible for kicking the team's first goal of the competition. Frederick recorded 13 disposals, six marks, and a goal against  in round four, for which she was nominated for the 2017 Rising Star award.

On 17 May 2017, Brisbane announced they had signed Frederick for the 2018 season.

Frederick was listed in the 2017 and 2018 All-Australian team.

She was retrospectively named in the AFL Players Association's 2017-2019 22under22 team, which recognises the best young players in the league.

Richmond (2020–2021)
In April 2019, Frederick expressed a desire to move to Victoria. Frederick was traded to expansion club  in exchange for a first round draft selection which was slated at the time to be pick 12 in the upcoming 2019 AFL Women's draft.

Collingwood (2022–)
With the opening of the trade period on 31 May 2021, Frederick was traded to Collingwood in exchange for Maddie Shevlin.

Statistics
Statistics are correct to the end of the S7 (2022) season.

|-
| scope="row" text-align:center | 2017
| 
| 14 || 8 || 6 || 4 || 72 || 22 || 94 || 20 || 15 || 58 || 0.8 || 0.5 || 9.0 || 2.8 || 11.8 || 2.5 || 1.9 || 7.3 || 4
|-
| scope="row" text-align:center | 2018
| 
| 14 || 8 || 8 || 7 || 65 || 26 || 91 || 29 || 21 || 27 || 1.0 || 0.9 || 8.1 || 3.3 || 11.4 || 3.6 || 2.6 || 3.4 || 6
|-
| scope="row" text-align:center | 2019
| 
| 14 || 7 || 1 || 7 || 44 || 27 || 71 || 21 || 23 || 7 || 0.1 || 1.0 || 6.3 || 3.9 || 10.1 || 3.0 || 3.3 || 1.0 || 0
|-
| scope="row" text-align:center | 2020
| 
| 14 || 6 || 3 || 7 || 30 || 15 || 45 || 15 || 13 || 26 || 0.5 || 1.2 || 5.0 || 2.5 || 7.5 || 2.5 || 2.2 || 4.3 || 0
|-
| scope="row" text-align:center | 2021
| 
| 14 || 9 || 2 || 4 || 43 || 35 || 78 || 17 || 14 || 44 || 0.2 || 0.4 || 4.8 || 3.9 || 8.7 || 1.9 || 1.6 || 4.9 || 0
|-
| scope="row" text-align:center | 2022
| 
| 1 || 9 || 4 || 8 || 35 || 41 || 76 || 18 || 15 || 26 || 0.4 || 0.9 || 3.9 || 4.6 || 8.4 || 2.0 || 1.7 || 2.9 || 0
|-
| scope="row" text-align:center | S7 (2022)
| 
| 1 || 12 || 2 || 8 || 54 || 41 || 95 || 25 || 25 || 73 || 0.2 || 0.7 || 4.5 || 3.4 || 7.9 || 2.1 || 2.1 || 6.1 || 
|- class="sortbottom"
! colspan=3 | Career
! 59
! 26
! 45
! 343
! 207
! 550
! 145
! 126
! 261
! 0.4
! 0.8
! 5.8
! 3.5
! 9.3
! 2.5
! 2.1
! 4.4
! 10
|}

Television

In 2020, it was announced Frederick would be participating the Seven Network's reality program SAS Australia. Frederick was one of three recruits to pass selection along with Merrick Watts and Nick Cummins. Along with Millie Boyle, she is one of just two female recruits to successfully pass selection.

Personal life
Frederick studied psychology at Murdoch University, and was part of the university's Elite Athlete Program. She previously worked at AFL Queensland as the Participation Programs Coordinator for Game Development.

Frederick married Lili Cadee-Matthews in December 2021 in Melbourne. In January 2022, Frederick announced that Cadee-Matthews was pregnant with the couple's first child.

References

External links

1996 births
Living people
All-Australians (AFL Women's)
Australian people of Antigua and Barbuda descent
Australian people of Jamaican descent
Australian rules footballers from Western Australia
Brisbane Lions (AFLW) players
English emigrants to Australia
English sportspeople of Antigua and Barbuda descent
English sportspeople of Jamaican descent
Lesbian sportswomen
LGBT Black British people
LGBT players of Australian rules football
Murdoch University alumni
People from Pinjarra, Western Australia
Richmond Football Club (AFLW) players
Sportswomen from Western Australia
Collingwood Football Club (AFLW) players